Clarksville School of Theology is a seminary in Clayton, North Carolina. It was founded in Clarksville, Tennessee and was shut down in 1982 by legal action after it was determined that its curriculum did not meet state standards for granting an academic degree. In the case, Tennessee ex rel. McLemore v. Clarksville School of Theology, the Tennessee Supreme Court upheld broad state regulation of a theological school that trained only ministers, offered no secular courses, and granted only theological degrees.

In November 1990, Dr. Roy Stewart retired from Clarksville School of Theology and Dr. Grover Twiddy became the second president of the school, consequently changing its name to Clarksville Theological Seminary and moving the college to Kinston, North Carolina.   As of January 15, 1996, Dr. Charles Ray Ennis became the third president and subsequently moved the school to its present location in Clayton, North Carolina.

References

Unaccredited Christian universities and colleges in the United States
Defunct private universities and colleges in Tennessee
Educational institutions disestablished in 1982
Seminaries and theological colleges in Tennessee
1982 in United States case law
Seminaries and theological colleges in North Carolina